Twix is a caramel shortbread chocolate bar made by Mars, Inc., consisting of a biscuit applied with other confectionery toppings and coatings (most frequently caramel and milk chocolate). Twix are packaged with one, two or four bars in a wrapper.

History 

The product was first produced in the United Kingdom in 1967, and introduced in the United States in 1979. Twix was called Raider in mainland Europe for many years before its name was changed in 1991 (2000 in Denmark, Finland, Norway, Sweden and Turkey) to match the international brand name. A Raider retro edition was temporarily sold in Germany in 2009, and in the Netherlands and Belgium in 2015.

Production
Twix bars for the North American market are made in Cleveland, Tennessee along with M&M's.

Advertising 
Since 2012, Twix launched the "Pick a Side" campaign. The advertising campaign introduced a rivalry of the two "sides" of the Twix bar. Each Twix bar was given its own distinct packaging, being labelled as either a "Right Twix" or a "Left Twix," although both sides are identical.

Ten years later in 2022, a new campaign that replaced the previous one finally put this rivalry to rest by explicitly clarifying that both bars are identical. The new tagline reflecting this states "Left or Right, a good decision either way."

Twix products

Bars

The following flavours are available in the United States of America.

 Twix Original
 Twix Salted Caramel
 Twix Cookies & Creme
 Twix Ice Cream Bar
 Twix 100 Calories
 Twix Cookie Dough

Other products
 Twix Ice Cream
Twix Caramel cookies
Twix Spekulatius seasonal limited edition (Germany)

Shrinkflation
Like many confectionery items, Twix has been accused of Shrinkflation where instead of increasing the cost of a bar Mars, Incorporated have decreased the size. A bar in the 1970s would have been 60g but in the 2020s they are 50g.

References

External links

 Twix Brand Homepage

Biscuit brands
Chocolate bars
Mars confectionery brands
Products introduced in 1967
British confectionery
American confectionery
Brand name confectionery